Joseph Goulden may refer to:

Joseph A. Goulden (1844–1915), American politician
Joseph C. Goulden (born 1934), American writer